Ontholestes cingulatus, known generally as the gold-and-brown rove beetle or carrion beetle, is a species of large rove beetle in the family Staphylinidae.

References

Further reading

External links

 

Staphylininae
Beetles described in 1802